Joshua Prince (December 9, 1976 – February 1, 2015) in Newport Beach, California), professionally known as Dust La Rock, was a New York-based artist and designer.

Biography 
From 2007 to 2012, Prince was the co-founder, art director, chief designer for Fool's Gold Records, working with artists A-Trak, Action Bronson, Danny Brown and Duck Sauce. His work often featured cartoonish illustrations, which defined the look of indie dance and hip-hop artists.

Before his death, he lived and worked in Los Angeles, California. Prince died on February 1, 2015.

References

External links
 

1976 births
2015 deaths
American graphic designers
American illustrators
People from Newport Beach, California